NWAC may refer to:
 National War Aims Committee, cross-party parliamentary organisation established to conduct propaganda within Britain during World War 1
 Native Women's Association of Canada
 Naval War: Arctic Circle, a naval strategy computer game
 New Wineskins Association of Churches, a group of about 200 Presbyterian churches in conflict with the Presbyterian Church (US)
 Northwest Airlines
 Northwest Athletic Conference, a sports association